A. compacta  may refer to:
 Asperdaphne compacta, a sea snail species
 Ayenia compacta, the California ayenia, a shrub species native to the Sonoran Desert and surrounding ranges in California, Arizona and Baja California
 Azorella compacta, the yareta or Llareta, a tiny flowering plant species native to South America

See also
 Compacta (disambiguation)